The 1999 Icelandic Men's Football League Cup was the fourth staging of the Icelandic Men's League Cup. It featured 36 teams.

The competition started on 11 March 1999  and concluded on 8 June 1999 with ÍA beating Fylkir 1-0 in the final.

Details
 The 36 teams were divided into 6 groups of 6 teams. Each team plays one match with other teams in the group once. The top 2 teams from each group qualified for the 2nd round along with the best four 3rd placed teams.

Group stage

Group A

Group B

Group C

Group D

Group E

Group F

Knockout stage

Second round

Quarter-finals

Semi-finals

Final

See also
Icelandic Men's Football Cup
Knattspyrnusamband Íslands - The Icelandic Football Association
Icelandic First Division League 1999

References
RSSSF Page - Deildabikar 1999

1999 domestic association football cups
1999 in Icelandic football
Icelandic Men's Football League Cup